Marshall Creek is a stream in Moniteau County in the U.S. state of Missouri. It is a tributary of North Moreau Creek.

Marshall Creek has the name of the original owner of the site.

References

Rivers of Moniteau County, Missouri
Rivers of Missouri